Taipei First Girls High School (TFG; ; colloquially  or ), is a Taiwanese all-girls senior high school, located in  Zhongzheng District, Taipei City. Accepting only the top scorers in the national Comprehensive Assessment Program for Junior High School Students, it is one of the most prestigious high schools in the country. TFG counts among its alumnae esteemed researchers, industry leaders, doctors, writers, and politicians. Its male counterpart is the Taipei Municipal Jianguo High School.

Overview 
The school was founded in 1904, as Taihoku Prefectural Taihoku First Girls' High School during Japanese rule. After the handover of Taiwan from Japan in 1945, the name was changed to Taiwan Provincial Taipei First Girls' High School on December 12. In 1967, it was renamed to Taipei Municipal First Girls' Senior High School due to Taipei City becoming a municipality. With its history stretching back over one hundred years, the school has had over 60,000 students. Currently, the school operates 78 classes and has about 3,000 students. In 2002, it was renamed to Taipei Municipal First Girls High School due to the bilingual project of school renaming in Taipei City.

The school's campus measures roughly 26,000 sq. metres, with a total of six main buildings - the oldest being Guang-Fu Building, a three-story structure built by the Japanese government in 1933 (notable as well for being bombed in 1945). Other buildings include Ming-De Building (completed 1954), Zhong-Zheng Building (completed 1977), the Library (Demolished and rebuilt as "Shue Chu Building"), the Activity Center (completed 1971), and Zhi-Shan Building (completed in 1993).

The school is famous for the traditions it maintains, including the uniform of a green shirt and black skirt/black trousers, carried over from air-raid days. The school has adopted various different policies regarding the traditional uniform over the decades, including incorporating pants, slacks and different jackets, yet it still keeps true to the tradition of the green shirt, which is recognized widely all across Taiwan. The green was initially used to distinguish the school from the Presidential Office (which was located directly across the street) during air raids. Every year on December 12, alumni all over the world participate in the International Taipei First Girls' High School Uniform Day and wear the green uniforms they once wore as students.

TFG has an acclaimed marching band, the Taipei First Girls' Marching Band. This band consists of eighty members, primarily sophomores. The MB has repeatedly won first prize in the national wind music competition for senior and vocational high schools. It also has two counterparts: the Honor Guard and the Color Guard. The students go through a rigorous training schedule and are known for their perseverance and resilience. These three organizations offer perform at national events, such as the annual National Day Parade and the 2009 Deaflympics. The TFG MBHGCG organizations have also ventured overseas, including performing in Singapore (1981), South Africa (1986), Beijing (1992), Nanjing (1992), Shanghai (1992), California's Rose Parade (1996), Edinburgh (1999), Glasgow (1999), Austria (2012), and France (2013).

Students at TFG are involved in a multitude of activities on campus. There are more than 50 student organizations and clubs within TFG including, but not limited to: 
Student Autonomy Student Council, TFG Ambassadors
Liberal Arts/Social Science-Related Language Club, Debate Club, Library Club, English Study Club, Japanese Culture Club, Life Club, Investment Club, Humor Club, Youth Parliament
Science Science Club, Biology Club, Informatics Club, Earth Sciences Club, Math Club, Brain Enhancement Club, Detective/Deduction Club
Arts Drama Club, Photography Club, Sign Language Club, Comic Research Club, Bridge Club, Chess Club, Go Club, Magic Club, Hand Puppet Club, Film Club, Desserts ;Club, Art Club, School Magazine, Poets' Club
Music String Orchestra, Traditional Music Ensemble, Choir, Harmonica Club, Classical Guitar Club, Pop Music Club, Rock Band, Music Creators' Club
Service Scout Troop, Eco Club, Anti-drugs Club, Kidland Club, Love Forward Club
Dance Dance Club, Aerobics Club, Breakdance Club, International Standard Dance Club, Lockin' Club
Sports Taekwondo Club, Baseball Club, Basketball Club, Traditional Sports Club, Skateboard Club, Badminton Club
TFG MBHGCG Marching Band, Honour Guards, Colour Guards

In addition to regular clubs, there are also committees that gather at specific times of the year to organize certain projects. One example is the Taipei First Girls' Graduation Committee, which is in charge of all graduation affairs for the seniors. Work starts in spring and the committees oftentimes consist of over 200 members. Instead of a traditional graduation ceremony, TFG prides itself on producing theater-like ceremonies where each graduating class has a specific story. In 2012, the theme was Alice in Wonderland; 2013 The Little Prince; 2014 Circus.

Features 
Over the past few decades the school has endeavored to modernize its facilities. In 1971 a sports and assembly hall was constructed. In 1993 a new building was completed: Zhi-Chan. This five-storey building has a large observatory located on the roof with several telescopes therein. Within the brand new Shue Chu Library building are IT facilities together with abundant reading materials, audio-visual headsets and Internet access. Free Wifi access is available throughout the school to facilitate mobile learning.

The school also encompasses an auditorium, conference rooms, a heated indoor swimming pool, and a subterranean parking lot.

Notable alumnae

Academia 
 Lily Yeh Jan, member of the US National Academy of Sciences, academician at Academia Sinica, and Professor at University of California, San Francisco
 Jennie Hwang, first Chinese female member of the US National Academy of Engineering, and Distinguished Professor at Case Western Reserve University
 Teresa Meng, Reid Weaver Dennis Professor of Electrical Engineering at Stanford University, and IEEE Fellow
 Yeh Nai-chang, Professor of physics at California Institute of Technology
 Ma Chung-pei, Professor of Astronomy at University of California, Berkeley, and Maria Goeppert-Mayer Award recipient
 Mei-Chi Shaw, Professor of Mathematics at University of Notre Dame
 Katherine Chen, national communications regulator and professor of public relations and statistics at National Chengchi University
 Louise Chow, discoverer of RNA splicing and alternative RNA processing
 Frances Yao, Chair Professor at the City University of Hong Kong
 Yi-Fang Tsay, botanist and member of the American National Academy of Sciences

Industry 
 Nancy T. Chang, co-founder and chairwoman of the Board of Directors of Tanox
 JoMei Chang, President and co-founder of Viria Technology
 Chang Yi Wang, chairperson and CEO of the United Biomedical, Inc. (UBI)

Politics and military 
 Annette Lu, first female Vice president of the Republic of China
 Kao Chia-yu, Councillor of the 11th to 13th Taipei City Council
 Wang Ching-feng, lawyer and Minister of Justice of the Republic of China
 Wang Ju-hsuan, Vice Presidential candidate for the 2016 presidential election
 Isabelle Cheng, intelligence agent for the National Security Bureau of Taiwan

Commerce 
 Christine Chow Ma, First Lady of the Republic of China

Arts and literature 
 Sanmao, Taiwanese novelist and travel writer
 Ouyang Tzu, Taiwanese novelist and literary critic
 Chu T’ien-hsin, Taiwanese author
 Qiu Miaojin, Taiwanese lesbian author
 Ping Lu, Chinese novel, essay, poem, commentary, and theater play author
 Selina Jen, singer and member of the Taiwanese girl-band S.H.E
 To-wen Tseng, American journalist and author

Others 
 Chiang Hsiao-chang, daughter of Chiang Ching-kuo

See also 
 Education in the Republic of China
 List of schools in Taiwan

References 

1904 establishments in Taiwan
Girls' schools in Taiwan
High schools in Taiwan
Educational institutions established in 1904
First Girls' High School